David A. Taylor (born 1961) is an American author and filmmaker on topics in history and science.

Taylor's books include Ginseng, the Divine Root (Algonquin) and Soul of a People: The WPA Writers’ Project Uncovers Depression America (Wiley), which the Pittsburgh Post-Gazette ranked among the Best Books of 2009.

Taylor has written articles for the Washington Post, Smithsonian magazine, Science, Microbe, National Geographic, and Washingtonian. He has written scripts for National Geographic Channel, PBS, Discovery and Smithsonian Channels.

Biography
Taylor's first book, Ginseng, the Divine Root, was published by Algonquin Books in June 2006. The Boston Globe called it "fantastic" and "one of those rare works that remind us what an endlessly surprising place the world is by revealing the drama concentrated in the past and present of one plant." Library Journal dubbed it "a fascinating tour" from "a master storyteller," and Publishers Weekly called it "an intelligent, wide-ranging account."

Taylor's second nonfiction book, Soul of a People: The WPA Writers’ Project Uncovers Depression America, published by Wiley & Sons in February 2009, was named an Amazon Book of the Month and a finalist in the Library of Virginia Literary Awards. The Pittsburgh Post-Gazette called the book "the place to start learning about that remarkable era" and ranked the book among the Best Books of 2009. According to the Southern Cultures reviewer, "The result of Taylor's curiosity is an accessible, straightforward glimpse into some of the most important American writers of the 1930s and 1940s. In the process of recounting their adventures, Taylor demonstrates how these writers shaped the way Americans tell their histories." NPR featured the book on All Things Considered, and anthology editors Frank W. Thackeray and John E. Findling called Soul of a People "an entertaining and informative look at the U.S. writers who participated in this Depression era government project. Revealing about both the writers and the condition of the United States at that time."

Publishers Weekly called Taylor's 2012 collaboration with Mark Collins Jenkins, an illustrated National Geographic book about the War of 1812, "an engaging series of narratives filled with fascinating historical flotsam" and said the authors "seldom engage in cheerleading, offering instead a captivating story."

Taylor's 2018 book, Cork Wars: Intrigue and Industry in World War II, published by Johns Hopkins University Press, as Grady Harp wrote in the San Francisco Review of Books, "reads like a thriller … particularly timely as we step lightly though portents of possible similar corruption and conspiracy. Brilliant writing!" Historian Douglas Brinkley called Cork Wars "a marvelous history," adding, "Taylor gives a vivid slice of life from that time that speaks to ours. A landmark achievement." In the Washington Independent Review of Books Cathy Alter wrote, "As he demonstrated with his previous book, Ginseng, the Divine Root, Taylor has a knack for taking unsung heroes and elevating them to star status." Alter called Soul of a People "a humane and seminal accounting of our country, not unlike Studs Terkel's Working."

Taylor writes articles for Discover and Smithsonian magazines, and teaches in the Science Writing certificate program at Johns Hopkins University.

Documentaries, television and podcasts

In the 1990s, Taylor began writing for television and documentary films. After writing for television series including Great Castles of Europe and the F.B.I. Files, he ventured into long-form documentary, serving as a creative consultant with Spark Media for the 2002 PBS documentary, Partners of the Heart, about racism and a pioneering partnership in medicine.

Taylor was the lead writer and co-producer on the documentary film based on his book, Soul of a People: Writing America’s Story, which was broadcast on Smithsonian Channel in October 2009. Directed by Andrea Kalin and produced by Spark Media, the film garnered a Writers Guild of America Awards nomination for best documentary (non-current affairs), a TIVA gold award for best documentary scriptwriting, and a Cine Best of DC award.

The view of the WPA experience of writers and artists during the Depression in Soul of a People provided a springboard for writers at the start of the 2020 COVID-19 shutdown to consider potential large-scale responses to the economic crisis. David Kipen in the Los Angeles Times called the film "a moving documentary," and quoted Taylor on the contrasts with the present: "We could try different models like start-ups with an eye for what might come out of this crisis. … But it would likely have more private and philanthropic partners." Taylor suggested the new version might create in newer mediums, like podcasts.

Ryan Prior, writing for CNN Arts, noted the writers profiled in Soul of a People—Richard Wright, Zora Neale Hurston, Ralph Ellison and Saul Bellow—and the impact of the Federal Writers' Project on their later careers and on American culture. Prior noted the reaction given by Nelson Algren: "Had it not been for the Project, the suicide rate would have been much higher. It gave new life to people who had thought their lives were over."

In the Chicago Tribune, Chris Borrelli pointed out that President Franklin Roosevelt had established the WPA with an executive order, and that by the late 1930s about 75,000 Chicagoans were working for the federal agency. He quotes Taylor on how that provided a talent incubator that catalyzed Chicago as a cultural driver even after the Depression ended. "Because of temperament perhaps, because unemployment had hit Chicago hard, because of the range of talent, and because those just out of college who needed jobs were thrown alongside veteran artists out of work, Chicago enormously benefited," Taylor said, those innovations fueled American culture for decades.

Revisiting that 1930s history in a new medium, Taylor in 2022 announced work on a podcast provisionally titled The People's Recorder, a collaboration with Spark Media. In August 2022, the podcast received a grant from the National Endowment for the Humanities, along with several state-level grants.

Short fiction

Taylor's short story collection, Success: Stories, received the 2008 Washington Writers Publishing House Award for Fiction. StorySouth wrote that the book's "fourteen superbly-crafted tales . . . explore the most vital crises of existence, when human emotions—desire and isolation, suspicion and jealousy—boil over, leaving in their wake exquisite failure and a conflict that blooms in complexity every time the reader revisits it." Publishers Weekly wrote that Taylor's stories "uncover gentle irony in the commonly held notion of a successful life." In Washington City Paper, Mark Athitakis wrote that Taylor's skills included "tight, convincing dialogue, and an eye for apt metaphors within the places his characters inhabit."

Taylor's stories have appeared in literary journals including Gargoyle, Potomac Review, Jabberwock, Barrelhouse, and Rio Grande Review, and in the anthologies Stress City, This Is What America Looks Like, and Eclectica's Best Fiction.

Personal life

Taylor was born in 1961 and grew up in Alexandria, VA. His father, William Taylor, was an army engineer felled by polio in his twenties in the early 1950s. He returned to work for the government after years of physical therapy. During David's early childhood, William Taylor worked at NASA on projects to track Soviet space plans, survey the moon's surface, and helped to design the lunar rover.

David Taylor received a bachelor's degree in English cum laude from Davidson College. He is married and lives in Washington, DC.

Awards

 Independent Publisher Book Award for History (World)
Writers Guild of America East Screenplay Reading Series
Career Grant from the National Association of Science Writers
 Virginia Center for the Creative Arts Fellowship
 CASE Media Fellowship
 National Endowment for the Humanities grants
 International Reporting Project Fellowship for reporting on malaria in West Africa
 Soul of a People and Success: Stories were both finalists in the Library of Virginia's Literary Arts Awards

Selected bibliography
Cork Wars: Intrigue and Industry in World War II. Baltimore: Johns Hopkins University Press, December 2018. (nonfiction)
Towards the Assessment of Trees Outside Forests. By Hubert de Foresta et al. A Thematic Report prepared in the framework of the Global Forest Resources Assessment 2010. Edited by David Taylor. Rome: FAO, 2013. (scientific report)
The War of 1812 and the Rise of the U.S. Navy. Mark Jenkins and David Taylor. Washington, DC: National Geographic Books, 2012. (nonfiction)
Tall Ship Odysseys: Fifty Years of Operation Sail. Boston: Boston Publishing Co., 2010. (nonfiction) 
The Dragon and the Elephant: Understanding the Development of Innovation Capacity in China and India: Summary of a Conference. Merrill, Stephen, Taylor, David A. et al. Washington, DC: National Academies Press, 2010. 64 pages. (scientific report)
Soul of a People: The WPA Writers’ Project Uncovers Depression America, by David Taylor. New Jersey: Wiley & Sons, 2009. (nonfiction)
Success: Stories. Fiction. Washington, DC: Washington Writers Publishing House, 2008. (short stories)
Ginseng, the Divine Root. NY and Chapel Hill: Algonquin Books, 2006. (nonfiction)

Documentary films
Worlds of Sound: The Ballad of Folkways for Smithsonian Channel's Inside the Music. 52 minutes. Smithsonian ChannelHD. 2009.
Soul of a People: Writing America’s Story. 93 minutes. NEH-funded program for Smithsonian ChannelHD. 2009.
Where Life Meets Art. Zora Neale Hurston in Maryland. 5 minutes. Spark Media. 2007.
Partners of the Heart, for PBS American Experience (creative consultant). 55 minutes. Spark Media. 2002.
Endangered Animals: Survivors on the Brink. National Geographic. 1997.

References

External links 
 

1961 births
20th-century American male writers
21st-century American male writers
American filmmakers
Davidson College alumni
Writers from Alexandria, Virginia
Writers from Washington, D.C.
Living people
20th-century American writers